Star was a locomotive designed by Isaac Dodds of the  configuration and built in 1833 at the Horsley Coal & Iron Company, Tipton, Birmingham, England.  Despite rebuilds it was never a successful engine and was scrapped in 1840.

History
Isaac Dodds became engaged with the Horsely Iron Company in the summer of 1832, and was seeming ably to facilitate orders from throughout the British Isles.  In 1833 the Liverpool and Manchester Railway, a leading railway operating company of that time, opened a competition for a new locomotive design.  The Dodd's designed entry though Horsley was seemingly the best entry, new locomotive innovations being claimed including a frame made from solid plate, use of expanding boiler attachment plates at the firebox end, and horizontal cylinders fitted outside the frame.  The resulting locomotive Star was initially trialled on the Liverpool and Manchester Railway (L&MR).

Liverpool and Manchester
A serious accident occurred on the L&MR when points were left set incorrectly and Star was directed onto the opposite track and collided with Caledonian leaving both badly damaged, an engineman killed, and a mechanic with a crushed foot,.  The accident occurred around February/March 1835, and the L&MR while willing to pay for repairs they were not prepared to purchase Star

Dublin and Kingstown
Star was subsequently bought by the Dublin and Kingstown Railway (D&KR) in April 1835.  Before the line opened D&KR directors had received advice from their consultants about the number of locomotives required to operate their line.  As Rastrick specified four and Charles Blacker Vignoles recommended eight the directors seemed to have elected for a middle figure of six, though experience eventually seems to have left the D&KR settling on nine. The collision of two locomotives in March 1835 plus ongoing maintenance problems left the D&KR with a possible motive power shortage.  In May 1835 Pollock, the representative of Star'''s owner Horlseys, would have seemed an attractive offer to increase the locomotive stock conveniently.  The D&KR's Company clerk Bergin who was also an engineer was in England at the time and recommended the directors purchase of Star; in the event an offer for £700 was accepted.Star arrived in Ireland in September 1835.  The engine did not appear to be in good order with unsafe wheels, bent rods and incorrectly adjusted valved gear and a seemingly incensed Bergin indicating the D&KR would not pay for the engine until corrected and delivery acceptance trials completed.  The D&KR did pay for the engine in December 1836.

A bonus award was given to locomotive superintendent John Melling in February 1838 for his rebuilding of Star.  UnfortunatelyStar suffered at least 5 derailments, one with a broken axle, up until a collision with the locomotive Victoria in June 1840.  Inspection of Star indicated a significant repair cost would be needed due to crash damage, previous inadequate damage and various components worn out to end-of-life.  Star'' was scrapped later that year, some parts were used in the building of Bellisle for cost saving purposes.

Notes

References

 
 
 
 
 
 

2-2-0 locomotives
Railway locomotives introduced in 1833
Standard gauge locomotives of Ireland
Steam locomotives of Ireland
5 ft 3 in gauge locomotives
Scrapped locomotives